Septemvri Tervel is a Bulgarian football club from the town of Tervel.

It plays its home matches at Septemvri stadium with a capacity of 700 seats, and its team colours are orange and white. The team currently plays in the Bulgarian third division. Septemvri Stadium was renovated in 2009 and now it holds 700 spectators.

Current squad
As of 1 September 2019

League positions

Association football clubs established in 1998
Football clubs in Bulgaria
1998 establishments in Bulgaria